Trudoden (portmanteau literally meaning labourday) was a unit of value and type of accounting of quantity and quality of labor (as a factor of production) in collective farms (kolkhozes) of the Soviet Union in 1930 – 1966. It literally means a day of labor. It was the only form of wage payments in collective farms, as the in-kind compensation for labor equaled the amount of trudodens per given time period. Beside working for free, a Soviet peasant of collective farm was not permitted to leave his or her village without permission from a head of the local collective farm.

Members of collective farms were paid based on the amount of trudodni (plural form) earned. Payments to the collective farm members were made with natural products such as grain, often of a very poor quality, when and if they were able to realize their products.

See also
 Wage slavery

References

Agriculture in the Soviet Union
Economic history of the Soviet Union
Labor in the Soviet Union
Unpaid work
Stalinism
Collective farming